The Men's World Weightlifting Championships were held in Vienna, Austria-Hungary from October 3 and December 2, 1909. There were 23 men in action from 3 nations. It was the 12th World Weightlifting Championships.

All medals won by Austrian weightlifters, Johann Eibel won the middleweight class while Josef Grafl won the heavyweight division.

Medal summary

Medal table

References 

Results
Weightlifting World Championships Seniors Statistics

External links 
International Weightlifting Federation

World Weightlifting Championships
World Weightlifting Championships
World Weightlifting Championships
International weightlifting competitions hosted by Austria